Consenting adult or consenting adults can refer to:

 Consent (criminal law), in particular in the case of sexual consent between two adults
 Consenting Adults (1992 film), a 1992 American thriller film, directed by Alan J. Pakula
 Consenting Adults (2007 film), a 2007 BBC Four television dramatisation of the events of the Wolfenden committee
 Consenting Adults (album), a 1994 album by Brad Mehldau, Mark Turner and Peter Bernstein
 Consenting Adult (film), a 1985 American made-for-television drama film